Harry Jerome is an outdoor 1986 bronze sculpture by Jack Harman of Canadian track and field runner Harry Jerome, installed at Stanley Park in Vancouver, British Columbia.

Description
The  statue commemorates Jerome's running career and depicts the sprinter with his "chest thrust forward into the finish tape".

History
The sculpture was unveiled in 1988. Someone placed an Iron Man helmet on the statue without permission in 2015; reports attributed the helmet to mischief or a guerrilla marketing campaign for the pending premiere of Marvel's Avengers: Age of Ultron. The statue's plaque was stolen in 2016. Toronto artist Moya Garrison-Msingwana's 2019 Google Doodle commemorating Jerome's birthday was "loosely inspired" by the statue.

See also

 1986 in art

References

External links
 

1986 sculptures
1988 establishments in Canada
Black people in art
Bronze sculptures in British Columbia
Cultural depictions of Canadian men
Cultural depictions of track and field athletes
Monuments and memorials in Vancouver
Outdoor sculptures in Vancouver
Sculptures of men in Canada
Stanley Park
Statues in Canada
Statues of sportspeople